Murchisonelloidea is an unassigned superfamily of mostly very small sea snails, marine gastropod mollusks and micromollusks within the clade Heterobranchia.

Families
 Murchisonellidae Casey, 1904
 Rhodopidae Ihering, 1876
Families brought into synonymy
 Ebalidae Warén, 1995 accepted as the subfamily Ebalinae Warén, 1995

References 

 Warén A. (2013) Murchisonellidae: who are they, where are they and what are they doing? (Gastropoda, lowermost Heterobranchia). Vita Malacologica 11: 1-14

Heterobranchia
Prehistoric animal superfamilies
Taxa named by Thomas Lincoln Casey Jr.